Pristimantis anemerus is a species of frog in the family Strabomantidae. It is endemic to Peru where it is only known from the region of its type locality near Canchaque, Huancabamba Province, in the Piura Region of north-western Peru.
Its natural habitat is humid montane forest.

References

anemerus
Endemic fauna of Peru
Amphibians of Peru
Amphibians of the Andes
Frogs of South America
Amphibians described in 1999
Taxonomy articles created by Polbot